The white-bellied tody-tyrant (Hemitriccus griseipectus) is a species of bird in the family Tyrannidae. It is found in Bolivia, Brazil, and Peru. Its natural habitat is subtropical or tropical moist lowland forests.

References

white-bellied tody-tyrant
Birds of the Amazon Basin
Birds of the Atlantic Forest
white-bellied tody-tyrant
white-bellied tody-tyrant
Taxonomy articles created by Polbot